Dildarnagar Kamsar or Kamsaar, (also known as Ahl-e-Kamsar or Kamsar-O-Bar) is a Pargana or a region of 32 places around Karamnasa river in Ghazipur district, and Kaimur District of Uttar Pradesh, and Bihar, India. Of whom main mouzas being 19. It is a large settlement of pathans mostly Khanzada Pathans and Afghan Pathans .

History
Dildarnagar Kamsar or also Known as Kamsar-O-Bar is a large fertile region located on the banks of Ganges and Karamnasa. Its original name is Kamsar which is derived from Kamesaradih where its founder Narhar Khan use to live in his small fort but later Bar(Bara) was added in it. Its history dates back to the time of a Mughal emperor Babur in the year 1530. When two rulers named Kam dev Rao Sikarwar or Rao Dalpat Dev and Dham Dev Rao Sikarwar's family came with their army to settle here. They were the rulers of present-day Gwalior, Morena and Jhansi and later the ruler of Kanpur and Fatehpur Sikri during Babur, They were Sikarwar Rajputs. They came here after their defeat in the Battle of Madarpur with Babur. They first settled on a place near Gahmar and then the elder brothers (Kam Dev or Rao Dalpat's) family shifted to a place named Dalpatpur now known as Reotipur. From there the family scattered all over Zamania and nearby area and establish more than a hundred villages in Ghazipur, Buxar and present-day Kaimur districts. While Dham Dev's family established Gahmar, Chausa, Bhabua, Chainpur and Kudra.

After the early settlement
In Kam Dev's or Rao Dalpat's family there was one of his 4th generation grandson named Narhar Dev who, influenced by Islam, became a Muslim. Being the eldest and most responsible in his family he was also granted a big jagir and Sarkar of the region and he became a nobleman and ruler of this region. His father's name was Puranmal Rao Sakarwar and eight sons among whom he was eldest. He had his fort at Kamesaradih. 

He recited kalma in Sher Shah Suri 's court where he went to pay up the lagan of his reasat and became a Muslim and got the title of Khan or Khan Bahadur in the year 1542 and became Narhar Khan. The legend says that before becoming a Muslim he and his wife weren't having any children and were very sad; but because of a prayer or miracle of a Sufi saint he later had five sons in the 1540s named as Jahangir Khan, Barbal Khan, Baran Khan, Usman Khan and Khan Jahan Khan Narhar Khan was also very influenced by Islam and Sufies his elder son Jahangir Khan also became a Sufi sant whose dargah is at Akhini village of Kamsar. Their descendants established many villages on the banks of Karamnasa and Ganga rivers. At its most spread Kamsar - O - bar was spread over more than half of Zamania tehsil some parts of Ramgarh, Nuaon, Chausa and Chainpur tehsils. His descendants are also Known as Muslim Rajput or Khanzada Rajput Pathans well know after many generations many other Pathan communities also live in this region and are intermixed. Later Mircha (previously known as an Amir Chak) and Dildarnagar (previously Deendarnagar) villages also emerged in the area. His descendants became noble people in the Mughal period and notable people of the region establishing many small Zamindari estates during Mughals and British rule the place was famous for having many zamindars, Lamberdars, Jagirdars, Faujdars, etc. There were also some small battles fought in this region (at Seorai, Dildarnagar) during the time of foreign invasions in the area or any big robbery. They also took great part in the rebellion of 1857, in the rebellion started by Kunwar Singh of Darbhanga.

Towns and villages
 
 
It consists of these places.

Dildarnagar
Usia
Faridpur
Rakasaha
Tajpur Kurrah
Gorasara
Mania
Khajuri
Kusi
Bhaksi

Jaburna
Dewaitha
Fufuao
Bahuwara
Saraila
Chitarkoni
Rasulpur
Kharaicha
Arangi
Akhini
Baksara
Palia
Seorai
Khizirpur
Mahana
Mircha
Muhammadpur
Bara
Sendura
Sihani
Sarhuja
Kadirpur
Kamesaradih

Notable people
Nazir Hussain Khan, Indian film actor 
Deputy Sayed Ahmad Khan, Social worker
Khan Shein Kunwar , writer

References

 Acharya Hazari Prasad Dwivedi Rachnawali, Rajkamal Prakashan, Delhi.
 Bibha Jha's Ph.D. thesis Bhumihar Brahmins: A Sociological Study submitted to the Patna University.
 People of India Uttar Pradesh Volume XLII Part Two edited by A Hasan & J C Das pages 718 to 724 Manohar Publications.
Page 179 & 180, census of India volume I ethnographic appendices(1903) by h.h. risley

Ghazipur district